Amantia is a genus of planthoppers in the family Fulgoridae, subfamily Poiocerinae. Species are distributed from Panama to Peru.

Species
 Amantia combusta (Westwood, 1845)
 Amantia imperatoria (Gerstaecker, 1860)
 Amantia magnifica Schmidt, 1910
 Amantia peruana Schmidt, 1910

References

Auchenorrhyncha genera
Poiocerinae